August Greene is a collaborative studio album by American rapper Common and record producers Robert Glasper and Karriem Riggins, recording as a supergroup of the same name, self-released on March 9, 2018. Recording sessions took place at Electric Lady Studios, Red Bull Studios and Brooklyn Recording in New York, and at Henson Recording Studios and NRG Studios in Los Angeles. It features contributions from Samora Pinderhughes, Brandy, Bilal, Estelle, Jeremiah Abiah and James Hall Worship & Praise Choir on vocals, Burniss Travis on bass, Patrick Warren on keyboards and strings, Elena Pinderhughes on flute and Roy Hargrove on trumpet.

Critical reception

August Greene was met with generally favorable reviews from music critics. At Metacritic, which assigns a normalized rating out of 100 to reviews from mainstream publications, the album received an average score of 72, based on five reviews.

Exclaim! reviewer praised tha album writing, "optimistic but never mawkish, August Greene distinguishes itself from other socially conscious albums with its practical approach. It's motivational music that, for once, makes change feel less elusive". Peter A. Berry of XXL described it as "a project filled with rich, jazzy vibes and all the tight lyricism we've come to expect from one of Chicago's very best". AllMusic's Andy Kellman wrote: "the set's predominantly reflective mood and nuanced composites of jazz, soul, and hip-hop make it sound like an extension of Glasper's Black Radio Recovered, Everything's Beautiful, and reinterpretation of Kendrick Lamar's "I'm Dying of Thirst" as much as the trio's meetings on Black America Again". Phillip Mlynar of Pitchfork wrote: "just as the album looks like it's about to settle and prosper in this zone, in comes "Piano Interlude", and the tone of August Greene shifts messily". In a mixed review, Josh Hurst of Slant stated, "the album is admirable and at times rewarding for its sense of experimentation, but only for those willing to meet it on its own terms".

Track listing

Personnel

Lonnie "Common" Lynn – main artist, vocals
Karriem Riggins – main artist, drums (tracks: 1-6, 8-11), guitar (track 9), producer
Robert Glasper – main artist, piano (track 1), keyboards (tracks: 2-11), producer
Samora Pinderhughes – vocals (tracks: 1-6, 8, 9, 11)
Burniss Earl Travis II – vocals (tracks: 2, 11), bass (tracks: 1-6, 8-11), mellotron (track 1)
Jeremiah Abiah – vocals (track 4)
Bilal Oliver – vocals (tracks: 6, 11)
Brandy Norwood – vocals (tracks: 9-11)
Elena Pinderhughes – vocals (track 9), flute (tracks: 9, 11)
Estelle Fanta Swaray – vocals (track 11)
James Hall Worship & Praise Choir – backing vocals (track 10)
Patrick Warren – keyboards and strings (track 5)
Roy Hargrove – trumpet (track 11)
Phil Joly – recording
Michael "Law" Thomas – recording (tracks: 1-9, 11)
Gosha Usov – recording (tracks: 1-6, 9-11)
Kyle Hoffmann – recording (tracks: 2, 3, 9)
Chris Tabron – recording (tracks: 3, 9)
Beatriz Artola – recording (tracks: 9, 10)
Billy Cumella – recording assistant
Tate McDowell – recording assistant (tracks: 1-9, 11)
Barry McCready – recording assistant (tracks: 1-3, 5)
Evan Sutton – recording assistant (tracks: 3, 9)
Jeff Citron – recording assistant (tracks: 8, 9)
Manny Marroquin – mixing
Chris Galland – engineering
Robin Florent – engineering assistant
Scott Desmarais – engineering assistant
Michelle Mancini – mastering
Gravillis Inc. – art direction, design
Brian "B+" Cross – photography

References

External links

2018 albums
Collaborative albums
Robert Glasper albums
Common (rapper) albums
Albums produced by Karriem Riggins
Albums recorded at Electric Lady Studios